Moses Chiam Shelesnyak (June 6, 1909 – September 12, 1994) was an American reproductive biologist. He received his B.A. at University of Wisconsin and Ph.D. in anatomy at Columbia University with a dissertation on the effects of pituitary hormone treatment on the uterus of the prepubertal rat and demonstration the synergistic interactions of estrogen with progesterone in preparing the uterus for pregnancy. Then he became the director of the Washington office of the Naval Arctic Research Laboratory. In 1950, he join Weizmann Institute of Science in Israel and founded Institute's Department of Biodynamics, now called the Department of Hormone Research. In 1968, he returned to the United States become a member in Smithsonian Institution until 1977. In 1994, he was found murdered in his home.

References

1909 births
1994 deaths
American biologists
20th-century biologists
1994 murders in the United States